Hell Yeah! is the debut album of Danish psychobilly band HorrorPops, released February 10, 2004.

The first seven tracks of the album were recorded in 1999 at Ventura Recordings. This was intended as a press kit only demo, however it was somehow copied and circulated leading to the tracks "Ghouls" and "Psychobitches Outta Hell" becoming a hit on the Copenhagen club circuit. The further six tracks making up the album were not recorded until 2003, again at Ventura Recordings. It was these 13 tracks that impressed Hellcat Records to the point of signing the band.

Track listing
 "Julia" (Day/Gaarde) – 2:45
 "Drama Queen" (Day) – 2:22
 "Ghouls" (Day) – 2:06
 "Girl in a Cage" (Day/Gaarde) – 2:58
 "Miss Take" (Day/Gaarde) – 3:58
 "Where They Wander" (Day/Gaarde) – 3:00
 "Kool Flattop" (Day/Gaarde/Tillander/Sylvest) – 3:09
 "Psychobitches Outta Hell" (Day/Gaarde) – 3:12
 "Dotted With Hearts" (Day/Gaarde) – 3:53
 "Baby Lou Tattoo" (Day) – 3:11
 "What's Under My Bed" (Day) – 3:15
 "Emotional Abuse" (Day/Gaarde) – 3:21
 "Horrorbeach" – 2:52

External links
 HorrorPops' Official Website
 HorrorPops' Official MySpace
 Epitaph Records - HorrorPops
 [ All Music entry]

2004 debut albums
HorrorPops albums
Hellcat Records albums